Vanessa Gravina (born  4 January 1974) is an Italian film, television and stage actress.

Born in Milan, Gravina debuted as a child actress in 1985, starring opposite Jerry Calà in the Marco Risi's romantic comedy Love at First Sight. For her performance she was nominated for Silver Ribbon for best new actress. In the following years she kept starring in films while continuing her studies at the Liceo linguistico. Starting in the late 1980s she gradually focused on television, where she got her main successes. She is also active on stage, where she worked with Dacia Maraini and Giorgio Strehler, among others.

She considers herself Buddhist.

References

External links 
 

Italian film actresses
1974 births
Actresses from Milan
Italian stage actresses
Living people 
20th-century Italian actresses 
Italian Buddhists